Gregore de Magalhães da Silva (born 2 March 1994), simply known as Gregore, is a Brazilian professional footballer who plays as a defensive midfielder for Major League Soccer club Inter Miami, of which he serves as captain.

Club career

Early career
Born in Juiz de Fora, Minas Gerais, Gregore was a Joseense youth graduate. He made his senior debut for the club on 14 March 2013, starting in a 1–0 home win against Batatais for the Campeonato Paulista Série A3 championship, and remained at the club when it changed its name to São José dos Campos FC.

In May 2015 Gregore moved to São Carlos. He was an undisputed starter for the side, who achieved promotion from Campeonato Paulista Segunda Divisão as champions.

Santos
On 17 December 2015 Gregore was loaned to Santos, initially assigned to the B-team. On 11 May 2016 he made his professional debut, coming on as a second-half substitute for Fernando Medeiros in a 3–0 away win against Galvez, for the year's Copa do Brasil.

Bahia
On 11 January 2018, Gregore was loaned to fellow Série A team Bahia, for one year. He made his top tier debut on 15 April, starting in a 2–0 away loss against Internacional.

On 25 May 2018, Gregore renewed his contract until 2021 after having 50% of his economic rights bought by Bahia. He ended the campaign as an undisputed starter, featuring in 35 matches. He also led the campaign in tackling, making him one of the best defensive midfielders of the season.

During the 2019 season, Gregore kept his great performances, leading the campaign in tackling once more. On 20 August 2020, Bahia bought more 40% of Gregore's economic rights, in order to own 90% in total, with his contract expiring at the final of the 2021 season.

Inter Miami
On 24 February 2021, Gregore joined Major League Soccer club Inter Miami. In November, he was named as the Inter Miami most valuable player of the 2021 season. He also led the number of tackles (55) among all teams of the MLS Regular Season.

Career statistics

Honours
São Carlos
Campeonato Paulista Segunda Divisão: 2015

Bahia
Campeonato Baiano: 2018, 2019, 2020

References

External links

1994 births
Living people
People from Juiz de Fora
Brazilian footballers
Association football midfielders
Campeonato Brasileiro Série A players
São Carlos Futebol Clube players
Santos FC players
Esporte Clube Bahia players
Clube Atlético Joseense players
Inter Miami CF players
Major League Soccer players
Sportspeople from Minas Gerais